Riot in Japan – Live!! is the second live album by the American heavy metal band Riot, recorded in June 1990 in Osaka and Tokyo, and first released in 1992 by Sony Music Japan. It marks the debut by bassist Pete Perez (Karion, Spastic Ink) who replaced Don Van Stavern at the end of the U.S. leg of The Privilege of Power tour. This album was taken from Front Of House console mixes by sound man George Geranios. There was no multi-track recording made.

In 1999, the album was issued in the U.S. as Live in Japan by Metal Blade Records. Both pressings contain a studio version of the Deep Purple classic "Smoke on the Water", recorded at Greene St. Recording in New York during The Privilege of Power sessions and featuring a special guest appearance by The New West Horns.

Track listing

Musicians
Tony Moore - vocals
Mark Reale - guitar
Mike Flyntz - guitar
Pete Perez - bass
Bobby Jarzombek - drums

References

Riot V albums
1992 live albums
Sony Music Entertainment Japan albums